The Jamaican Records in Swimming are the fastest times ever swum by a swimmer representing Jamaica. These records are kept by Jamaica's national swimming federation: the Amateur Swimming Association of Jamaica (ASAJ).

Records are recognized for males and females in the following long course (50m) and short course (25m) events:

freestyle: 50, 100, 200, 400, 800 and 1500;
backstroke: 50, 100 and 200;
breaststroke: 50, 100 and 200;
butterfly: 50, 100 and 200;
individual medley (I.M.): 100 (25m only), 200 and 400;
relays: 4x50 free (25m only), 4x100 free, 4x200 free, 4x50 medley (25m only), and 4x100 medley.
All records were set in finals unless noted otherwise.

Long Course (50 m)

Men

Women

Mixed relay

Short Course (25 m)

Men

Women

References
General
Jamaican Long Course Records 15 April 2019 updated
Jamaican Short Course Records 15 April 2019 updated
Specific

External links
ASAJ web site
ASAJ records page

Jamaica
Records
Swimming
Swimming